The Armée des émigrés (English: Army of the Émigrés) were counter-revolutionary armies raised outside France by and out of royalist émigrés, with the aim of overthrowing the French Revolution, reconquering France and restoring the monarchy. These were aided by royalist armies within France itself, such as the Chouans, and by allied countries such as Great Britain. They fought, for example, at the sieges of Lyon and Toulon.

They were formed from:
noblemen volunteers, either descendants of the ancient royal family or not, who had fled France
troops raised by these nobles through subsidies from other European monarchies, or through their own means
units of the French army which had also emigrated, such as the Régiment de Saxe Hussards

Even Napoleon I said of them "True, they are paid by our enemies, but they were or should have been bound to the cause of their King. France gave death to their action, and tears to their courage. All devotion is heroic".

1802, Napoleon Bonaparte, First Consul, decreed a general amnesty for all but around a thousand of the Émigrés, with the exception of commanders and those who held ranks in armies hostile to the French Republic.

Main units

Armée de Condé

 Régiment de Mortemart

Armée des Princes
Raised in Germany in 1792, at Trier, and commanded by marshals de Broglie and de Castries, under the aegis of Louis XVI's brothers, the comte de Provence and duc d'Artois. 10,000 strong, it returned to France beside the army of Brunswick and was dismissed on 24 November 1792, two months after the French victory at Valmy.

Armée de Bourbon

Other units

Légion des Pyrénées
 Creation: 1794
 Also known as: Légion royale des Pyrénées in May
 Founder: Marquis de Saint-Simon
 Commander: Marquis de Saint-Simon
 Size: 600 infantrymen and a squadron of hussars
 Theatre of operations: Pyrénées-Atlantiques
 Engagements: Saint-Étienne-de-Baïgorry (26 April 1794), heavy losses (17 prisoners guillotined); montagnes d’Arquinzun (10 July), heavy losses (30 to 50% of its effective strength); Port-Bidassoa (24 July), heavy losses covering the Spanish retreat (50 captured); Siege of Pamplona (November).
 Operated within the Spanish army of Navarre
 Sent to the front in 1795, then integrated into the Régiment de Bourbon

Légion de Panetier
 Creation: 1793
 Also known as: Légion de la Reine (d'Espagne) in June 1794
 Founder: Comte de Panetier (died January 1794)
 Commander: Comte de Panetier, then Général de Santa-Clara
 Size: 400; brought up to strength in June 1794 by the companies du Royal-Provence escaping from the Siege of Toulon and the companies du Royal Roussillon
 Theatre of operations: Pyrénées-Orientales
 Engagements: Defence of Port-Vendres (May 1794), evacuated by sea (to avoid being captured and guillotined); Zamora 5 January 1796
 Operating within the Spanish army
 Amalgamated into the Régiment de Bourbon

Légion du Vallespir
 Creation: 1793
 Also known as: Bataillon de la frontière circa May 1793
 Founder: Spanish general Ricardos, Spanish soldiers under Émigré officers
 Commander:
 Size:
 Theatre of operations: Defence of Vallespir, then defending Roussillon
 Engagements:
 Operating within the Spanish army
 Several desertions to the légion de Panetier - Amalgamated into the Régiment de Bourbon

Royal Roussillon
 Creation: January 1794 at Barcelona from émigrés, prisoners and deserters
 Also known as:
 Founder: Général Ricardos
 Commander:
 Size: 200 in June of 1794 (of which 129 were massacred by a mob since they were amusing themselves in their barracks on a procession day)
 Theatre of operations:
 Engagements: None
 Subsumed into the Légion de Panetier (becoming the Légion de la Reine at that moment)

Régiment de Bourbon
 Creation: 1796 from the Légion de la Reine (ex-Légion de Panetier), the Bataillon de la frontière, and the Légion royale des Pyrénées
 Also known as: Integrated into the Spanish army as number 47, then 37
 Founder: Marquis de Saint-Simon
 Commander : Marquis de Saint-Simon
 Size: 1600 (1808)
 Theatre of operations: garrisoning Ciudad Rodrigo (1797) then Mallorca
 Engagements: Siege of Girona (fell 9 December 1808, 300 captured); Rozas (1808)
 Operating within the Spanish army
 Still in existence in 1814; formed of foreign soldiers and Gardes Wallonnes, under number 41, then in 1860 became Spain's "53rd infantry regiment", known as El Emigrado.

See also
 Catholic and Royal Army
 Chouan Army of Rennes and Fougères
 Hussards de Saxe
 Chouannerie
 War in the Vendée

Notes

External links
 Les forces armées de l'émigration française pendant la Révolution